Eagle River may refer to the following streams in the U.S. State of Alaska:

Eagle River (Cook Inlet) flows through the community of Eagle River into Cook Inlet near Anchorage
Eagle River (Favorite Channel) flows into Favorite Channel northwest of Juneau
Eagle River (Bradfield Canal) empties into the Bradfield Canal near Wrangell

See also
 Eagle River, Anchorage, a suburb of Anchorage, Alaska
List of rivers of Alaska